Anwar bin Ibrahim (born 10 August 1947) is a Malaysian politician who has served as the 10th Prime Minister of Malaysia since November 2022. He served as the 12th and 16th Leader of the Opposition from August 2008 to March 2015 and again from May 2020 to November 2022. He has also served as Minister of Finance from March 1991 to September 1998 and again since December 2022 and 2nd Chairman of the Pakatan Harapan (PH) coalition since May 2020, 2nd President of the People's Justice Party (PKR) since November 2018 and the Member of Parliament (MP) for Tambun since November 2022. He also served as Deputy Prime Minister and in many other Cabinet positions in the Barisan Nasional (BN) administration under former Prime Minister Mahathir Mohamad from 1982 until his removal in 1998. He is the first prime minister to appoint two deputy prime ministers.

A graduate from University of Malaya, Anwar started his political career as President of student union Persatuan Kebangsaan Pelajar Islam Malaysia (PKPIM) and one of the founders and 2nd President of youth organisation Angkatan Belia Islam Malaysia (ABIM). After joining the United Malays National Organisation (UMNO), the major party in the long-time ruling BN coalition, Anwar held several cabinet positions in successive governments in the 1980s and 1990s. He was Deputy Prime Minister and Finance Minister during the 1990s and was prominent in Malaysia's response to the 1997 Asian financial crisis. In 1998, he was removed from all posts by Prime Minister Mahathir Mohamad and went on to spearhead the Reformasi movement against the government. Anwar was jailed in April 1999 after a trial for sodomy and corruption that was criticised by human rights groups and several foreign governments, until his release in 2004 after his conviction was overturned. He made a comeback as Leader of the Opposition from 2008 to 2015 and coalesced opposition parties into the Pakatan Rakyat (PR) coalition, which unsuccessfully contested in the 2008 and 2013 general elections. He disputed the results of the 2013 elections and led a protest in response.

In 2014, Anwar's attempt to become Selangor head of government in the 2014 Kajang Move led to a nine-month political crisis, which ended when he was sentenced to another five years imprisonment after a second sodomy conviction in 2015. While still in prison, Anwar re-joined Mahathir Mohamad in the new Pakatan Harapan (PH) coalition in absentia, which went on to win the 2018 general election. Mahathir outlined a plan for Anwar to take over from himself as Prime Minister after an unspecified interim period. Anwar received a royal pardon from Yang di-Pertuan Agong Muhammad V and was released from prison in May 2018. He returned to parliament in the 2018 Port Dickson by-election while his wife Wan Azizah Wan Ismail served as the Deputy Prime Minister in the PH administration. The collapse of the coalition during 2020–22 Malaysian political crisis led to the new Perikatan Nasional (PN) coalition under Muhyiddin Yassin being sworn in and Anwar becoming Leader of the Opposition for the second time in May 2020.

After leading Pakatan Harapan to win a plurality of seats at the 2022 Malaysian general election, Anwar was sworn-in as the tenth Prime Minister of Malaysia on 24 November 2022. On 2 December 2022, Anwar appointed various members of Parliament from Pakatan Harapan, Gabungan Parti Sarawak (GPS), and UMNO to serve as ministers in the cabinet of the newly-formed unity government. Anwar named himself as the Finance Minister. Anwar has long been an advocate for Islamic democracy and for reforms to Malaysia's political system. Outside of politics, Anwar has held positions at various academic institutions.

Early life and education
Anwar bin Ibrahim was born in Cherok Tok Kun, Bukit Mertajam, Penang, Malaya. His father, Ibrahim bin Abdul Rahman, started his career as a hospital porter, later to join politics as the UMNO Member of Parliament for Seberang Perai Central between 1959 and 1969 and also as the Parliamentary Secretary in the Ministry of Health from 1964 to 1969 until his defeat in the 1969 General Election by a candidate from Gerakan. His mother, Che Yan binti Hussein, was a housewife active in UMNO grassroots politics in Penang.

He undertook his secondary education at the Malay College Kuala Kangsar. He was educated at the University of Malaya, where he got a bachelor's degree in Malay Studies, and worked on his Masters in Literature through the National University of Malaysia while in prison from 1974 to 1975.

Early years (1968–1982)

From 1968 to 1971, as a student, Anwar was the president of the National Union of Malaysian Muslim Students. Around the same time, he was also the president of the University of Malaya Malay Language Society ( (PBMUM)). In 1971, he was a member of the pro tem committee of Angkatan Belia Islam Malaysia (ABIM) or Muslim Youth Movement of Malaysia, which he co-founded. At the same time, he was elected as the 2nd President of the Malaysian Youth Council or Majlis Belia Malaysia (MBM). In 1974, Anwar was arrested during student protests against rural poverty and hunger. This came as a report surfaced stating that a family died from starvation in a village in Baling, in the state of Kedah, which was later demonstrated to be false. However, the rubber tappers in Baling were experiencing severe hardship as the price of rubber dropped in 1974. He was imprisoned under the Internal Security Act (ISA), which allows for detention without trial, and spent 20 months in the Kamunting Detention Centre. From 1975 until 1982, he served as a representative for Asia Pacific of World Assembly of Muslim Youth (WAMY). Anwar Ibrahim is also the co-founder of the International Institute of Islamic Thought (IIIT) in the USA (founded 1981). Anwar has been one of 4 acting directors, a board member of IIIT and a trustee. He was also a chancellor of International Islamic University Kuala Lumpur between 1983 and 1988.

Early political career (1982–1993)
In 1982, Anwar, who was the founding leader and second president of an Islamic youth organisation called Angkatan Belia Islam Malaysia (ABIM), by joining the United Malays National Organisation (UMNO), led by Mahathir Mohamad, who had become prime minister in 1981.

Anwar rapidly rose to high-ranking positions; his first ministerial office was that of Minister of Culture, Youth and Sports in 1983; after that, he headed the Agriculture Ministry in 1984 before becoming Minister of Education in 1986.

During his tenure as Education Minister, Anwar introduced numerous policies in the national school curriculum. One of his major changes was to rename the national language from Bahasa Malaysia to Bahasa Melayu. Non-Malays criticised this move as it would cause the younger generation to be detached from the national language since they would attribute it to being something that belongs to the Malays and not to Malaysians.

As the minister of education, Anwar was elected as the 25th President of UNESCO's General Conference. In 1988, Anwar Ibrahim became the second President of International Islamic University of Malaysia. According to former Law Minister Zaid Ibrahim, Anwar is an Islamist who "helped Islamicise the whole government system" and played a major role in the Islamicisation of the education system when he was Education Minister in the 1980s.

In 1991, Anwar was appointed as Minister of Finance. During his tenure as Finance Minister, his impact was immediate; Malaysia enjoyed unprecedented prosperity and economic growth. Shortly after becoming Finance Minister, Euromoney named him as a top-four finance minister and in 1996 Asiamoney named him Finance Minister of the Year. In the midst of the 1997 Asian financial crisis, Anwar, as a deputy prime minister and finance minister, was hailed for guiding Malaysia through the period of instability. Anwar backed free-market principles and highlighted the proximity of business and politics in Malaysia. He advocated greater accountability, refused to offer government bail-outs and instituted widespread spending cuts. In March 1998, Anwar was selected as the Chairman of the Development Committee of World Bank and International Monetary Fund (IMF) from March 1998 until September 1998.

Deputy Prime Minister (1993–1998)
In 1993, he became Mahathir's Deputy Prime Minister after winning the Deputy Presidency of UMNO against Ghafar Baba, he was seen and expected to succeed Mahathir as prime minister as he frequently alluded in public to his "son-father" relationship with Mahathir. By then, speculation was rife about Anwar's ascent to the Deputy Prime Minister's position.

In May 1997, Mahathir had appointed Anwar to be acting Prime Minister while he took a two-month holiday. In Mahathir's absence, Anwar had independently taken radical steps, which directly conflicted with Mahathir's policies, to change the country's governing mechanisms. Issues such as how Malaysia would respond to a financial crisis were often at the forefront of this conflict. Towards the end of the 1990s, however, the relationship with Mahathir had begun to deteriorate, triggered by their conflicting views on governance.

Anwar's frontal attack against what he described as the widespread culture of nepotism and cronyism within UMNO (and the ruling coalition as a whole) angered Mahathir, as did his attempts to dismantle the protectionist policies that Mahathir had set up. "Cronyism" was identified by Anwar as a major cause of corruption and misappropriation of funds in the country.

Financial crisis
During the 1997 Asian Financial Crisis, Anwar supported the IMF plan as a finance minister. He also instituted an austerity package that cut government spending by 18%, cut ministerial salaries and deferred major projects. "Mega projects", despite being a cornerstone of Mahathir's development strategy, were greatly curtailed.

Although many Malaysian companies faced bankruptcy, Anwar declared: "There is no question of any bailout. The banks will be allowed to protect themselves and the government will not interfere."  Anwar advocated a free-market approach to the crisis, including foreign investment and trade liberalisation. Mahathir blamed currency speculators like George Soros for the crisis and supported currency controls and tighter regulation of foreign investment.

Fall from power and first sodomy conviction

In 1998 Newsweek magazine named Anwar the "Asian of the Year". However, in that year, matters between Anwar and Mahathir came to a head around the quadrennial UMNO General Assembly. The Youth wing of UMNO, headed by Anwar's associate Ahmad Zahid Hamidi, gave notice that it would initiate a debate on "cronyism and nepotism".  At the General Assembly, a book by Khalid Jafri, "50 Dalil Kenapa Anwar Tidak Boleh Jadi PM" ("50 Reasons Why Anwar Cannot Become Prime Minister") was circulated containing graphic allegations of homosexuality, as well as accusations of corruption against Anwar. Khalid Jafri was an ex-editor of the government-controlled newspaper Utusan Malaysia and former editor-in-chief of a failed magazine, Harian National. Anwar obtained a court injunction to prevent further distribution of the book and filed a lawsuit against the author for defamation. Police charged the author of the book with malicious publishing of false news. The police were instructed to investigate the veracity of the claims.

On 2 September 1998, Anwar was fired from the Cabinet, and many reports state that he was under investigation for sodomy, an act that is illegal in Malaysia. The following day, he was expelled from UMNO. In what the Sydney Morning Herald termed a "blatantly political fix-up", Anwar was arrested on 20 September 1998 and detained without trial under the country's controversial Internal Security Act (ISA). The Home Minister at the time was also the Prime Minister, Mahathir. Weeks later, Anwar was charged with corruption for allegedly interfering with the police investigation of him. While he was in police custody in 1998, Anwar was beaten by the then Inspector General of Police, Rahim Noor. The public and the media only witnessed his black eye after being brought to Court for the first time. Mahathir remarked that it could have been a self-inflicted injury to garner public sympathy. Rahim was subsequently found guilty of assault and jailed for two months in 2000. He made a public apology to Anwar and paid undisclosed damages.

During the trial, a mattress supposedly stained with Anwar's semen was presented to the court as DNA evidence of Anwar's sexual acts. Anwar denied having anything to do with the mattress, although the DNA tests came out positive. Lim Kong Boon, a DNA chemist, testified during the trial that DNA taken from 10 of 13 semen stains on the mattress matched Anwar's DNA. The defence team implied that DNA samples may have been taken from Anwar, while unconscious, after his beating in police custody, to create false forensics evidence to frame Anwar; however, High Court Judge Augustine Paul accepted that DNA evidence.

The High Court eventually handed down its decision in April 1999, sentencing Anwar to six years' imprisonment for corruption and sodomy. Two months later, he was sentenced to nine years' imprisonment for sodomy, which he was ordered to serve after completing his six-year sentence for corruption. His trial and conviction were widely discredited by the international community. Amnesty International stated that the trial proceedings "exposed a pattern of political manipulation of key state institutions including the police, public prosecutor's office and the judiciary" and declared Anwar a prisoner of conscience, stating that he had been arrested in order to silence him as a political opponent.

The Federal Court overturned his conviction and Anwar was finally released from solitary confinement on 2 September 2004.

Reformasi and formation of KEADILAN (1998–1999)

Shortly after Anwar was dismissed as deputy prime minister by the then prime minister Mahathir Mohamad, Anwar and his supporters initiated the Reformasi movement. It consisted of several mass demonstrations and rallies against the long-standing Barisan Nasional coalition government. At the 1998 APEC Summit in Kuala Lumpur, the vice-president of the United States, Al Gore, gave a speech supporting Anwar and the Reformasi movement in front of the Prime Minister of Malaysia and other Asia-Pacific premiers.

Reformasi led to the formation of a new multiracial-based party named Parti Keadilan Nasional or National Justice Party (KEADILAN). In 1999, a general election was held. The new KEADILAN, Pan-Malaysian Islamic Party (PAS), and Democratic Action Party (DAP) formed a Barisan Alternatif or Alternative Front (BA), in a combined initiative to replace the standing Barisan Nasional (BN) coalition government. In August 2003, KEADILAN merged with Parti Rakyat Malaysia or Malaysian's People Party (PRM) to form Parti Keadilan Rakyat or People's Justice Party (PKR) headed by Wan Azizah as president. PKR made huge gains in the 2008 general election, winning 31 seats and becoming the parliament's largest opposition party. In April 2008, PKR, PAS and DAP formed a new alliance named Pakatan Rakyat (PR).

Interim years (1999–2007)

First sodomy conviction
In 1999, Anwar brought suit against Prime Minister Mahathir for defamation for allegedly uttering accusations of immoral acts and calling Anwar a homosexual at a news conference in Malaysia.

The sodomy verdict was partially overturned in 2004, resulting in Anwar's release from prison as he had already served his sentence for the corruption offence. Anwar successfully sued Khalid Jafri for his "50 Dalil Kenapa Anwar Tidak Boleh Jadi PM" book, but Khalid died in 2005 of complications from diabetes before the High Court found that he had committed libel and awarded Anwar millions of ringgit in compensation. The Federal Court on 8 March 2010 ruled that the 1998 dismissal of Anwar from his Cabinet posts by Mahathir was constitutional and valid, meaning Anwar had failed in his bid to challenge his sacking.

An appeal on the corruption charges was heard on 6 September 2004. Under Malaysian law, a person is banned from political activities for five years after the end of his sentence. Success in this appeal would have allowed him to return to politics immediately. On 7 September, the court agreed to hear Anwar's appeal. However, on 15 September, the Court of Appeal ruled unanimously that its previous decision to uphold a High Court ruling that found Anwar guilty was in order, relegating Anwar to the sidelines of Malaysian politics until 14 April 2008. The only way for Anwar to have been freed from this structure would have been for him to receive a pardon from the Yang di-Pertuan Agong, informally known as the King of Malaysia.

Teaching and non-profit work
After his release from prison, Anwar held teaching positions at St Antony's College, Oxford, where he was a visiting fellow and senior associate member, at Johns Hopkins University's School of Advanced International Studies in Washington DC as a Distinguished Senior Visiting Fellow, and in 2005–2006 as a visiting professor at the Prince Alwaleed Center for Muslim–Christian Understanding in the School of Foreign Service at Georgetown University. In March 2006 he was appointed as Honorary President of the London-based organisation AccountAbility (Institute of Social and Ethical AccountAbility).

In July 2006, Anwar was elected Chair of the Washington-based Foundation For the Future. In this capacity, he signed 1 October 2006 letter to Robin Cleveland of the World Bank, requesting the transfer of Shaha Riza from the US Department of State to the Foundation for the Future. This transaction led to Paul Wolfowitz's resignation as president of the organisation. He was one of the signatories of "A Common Word Between Us and You" in 2007, an open letter by Islamic scholars to Christian leaders, calling for peace and understanding.

Return to politics
In November 2006, Anwar announced he planned to run for Parliament in 2008 after his disqualification expired. Anwar was critical of government policies after his release from prison, most notably the New Economic Policy (NEP), which provided affirmative action for the Bumiputras. The policy set a number of quotas, such as for units of housing and initial public offerings, that must be met.

Before he became re-entitled to run for Parliament in 2008, he acted as an "advisor" of Parti Keadilan Rakyat, the party of which his wife Dr Wan Azizah was president. He was at the forefront in organising a November 2007 mass rally, called the 2007 Bersih Rally, which took place at Dataran Merdeka, Kuala Lumpur, to demand clean and fair elections. The gathering was organised by Bersih, a coalition comprising political parties and civil society groups, and drew supporters from all over the country.

The 2008 general election date was set for 8 March 2008, before Anwar's disqualification from politics expired, sparking criticisms that Barisan Nasional called for early elections in a bid to deny Anwar's plans for a return to Parliament. In response, Anwar's wife, Wan Azizah Wan Ismail, declared that she would step down should she retain her Permatang Pauh parliamentary seat to force a by-election in which Anwar himself would contest.

When asked about the possibility of Anwar becoming the next Prime Minister, former leader Tun Dr Mahathir reacted by saying, "He would make a good Prime Minister of Israel".

On 14 April 2008, Anwar celebrated his official return to the political stage, as his ban from public office expired a decade after he was fired as Deputy Prime Minister. The opposition seized a third of parliamentary seats and five states in the worst-ever showing for the Barisan Nasional coalition that has ruled for half a century, with Anwar at the helm. A gathering of more than 40,000 supporters greeted Anwar in a rally welcoming his return to politics. Police interrupted Anwar after he had addressed the rally for nearly two hours and called for him to stop the gathering since there was no legal permission for the rally.

On 29 April 2008, after 10 years of absence, he returned to the Parliament, albeit upon invitation as a spouse guest of Wan Azizah Wan Ismail, People's Justice Party and the first female opposition leader in Malaysian Parliament's history.

Permatang Pauh by-election

Anwar Ibrahim was victorious in the Permatang Pauh by-election held on 26 August 2008. Muhammad Muhammad Taib, information chief of the UMNO, stated: "Yes, of course we have lost ... we were the underdogs going into this race." Final results announced by the Election Commission revealed that Anwar Ibrahim won 31,195 of the estimated 47,000 votes cast in the district, while Arif Shah Omar Shah received 15,524 votes and a third candidate had 92 votes.

On 28 August 2008, Anwar, dressed in a dark blue traditional Malay outfit and black songkok hat, took the oath at the main chamber of Parliament house in Kuala Lumpur, as MP for Permatang Pauh at 10.03 am before Speaker Tan Sri Pandikar Amin Mulia. He formally declared Anwar the leader of the 3-party opposition alliance. With his daughter Nurul Izzah Anwar, also a parliamentarian, Anwar announced: "I'm glad to be back after a decade. The prime minister has lost the mandate of the country and the nation." At that time Anwar needed 30 government lawmakers to defect to the Opposition to form the next government.

First term as Leader of the Opposition (2008–2015)

On 26 August 2008, Anwar won re-election in the Permatang Pauh by-election and returned to Parliament as Leader of the Opposition. He has stated the need for liberalisation, including an independent judiciary and free media, to combat the endemic corruption that he considers pushes Malaysia close to failed state status.

Petition against Najib Razak
Anwar continued to attack Najib on his first day as prime minister, stating he found inconsistencies in the latter's decision to release 13 Internal Security Act (ISA) detainees. He said as long as the ISA existed, Barisan Nasional could still detain citizens at will. In September 2011 Prime Minister Najib Razak acted to abolish the ISA and three other laws. Some members of the opposition did not view this in a positive way.

Parliamentary censure over APCO and 1Malaysia
Anwar has made numerous remarks about a supposed conspiracy among the Malaysian government, APCO (a public relations firm retained by the Malaysian government), Israel, and the United States. Anwar condemned the Malaysian government for seeking advice from APCO. He claims that the firm is linked to the "murder of Muslims in Palestine." He further claims to have given proof to a disciplinary committee of the Malaysian parliament, investigating his comments, that APCO is a front for the Israeli government. On another occasion, Anwar, speaking from the parliament, claimed that the firm was controlled by Jews and working on behalf of the American government to influence Malaysian foreign policy. He further implied that changes in Malaysian foreign policy could only be explained if Jews were manipulating Malaysia for the United States.

On 22 April 2010 Anwar was censured by Malaysia's parliament for remarks he made during a press conference in parliament on 30 March 2010. During the press conference, Anwar claimed to have documents linking 1Malaysia with One Israel and the public relations firm APCO but refused to allow access to the documents when challenged. The Malaysian government and APCO have both strongly denied Anwar's allegations. The censure motion passed by the House of Representatives referred Anwar's case to the Rights and Privileges Committee which will recommend a punishment for approval by the full chamber. Such punishment could include being banned from parliament. However Anwar retaliated against the Malaysian government attacks by producing two documents to support his claims of links between APCO and 1Malaysia.

Attempts to form a majority coalition
Anwar has missed several deadlines he personally set for the transfer of power. Anwar said he would need more time, and the recalibration of his message has not gone unnoticed: Deputy Prime Minister Najib Razak chose that day to initiate a broadband internet program Anwar opposes, saying that he had not doubted that the government would still be in office on 16 September. Prime Minister Abdullah Badawi too pointed out that Anwar had missed his own deadline, and dismissed his claim to have secured the defection of 30 MPs.

By 25 September, Anwar had still not amassed enough votes, creating doubts for Malaysians about whether he was really ready to take power, particularly in light of his failure to meet his own 16 September deadline for the transition of power.  In the interim, UMNO had its own party meeting to broker Prime Minister Abdullah Ahmad Badawi's step down from power in June 2009, a year earlier than previously promised

On 24 October 2008, Anwar admitted problems with his stalled bid to topple the UMNO's majority, saying that Pakatan Rakyat is running out of options to create a majority. His "credibility among ordinary Malaysians has been somewhat dented after Sept 16 and the new promise of forming the Government has not generated the sort of anticipation or excitement as before." Media within the country have taken an increasingly hostile view towards Anwar's protestations and failed threats to assemble a majority government.

2013 general election

In the 2013 general election (GE13), Anwar Ibrahim, as the Leader of the Opposition, led his Pakatan Rakyat coalition (comprising the three parties DAP, PAS, and PKR) to contest in the election. On 25 February 2013, Pakatan Rakyat launched their manifesto titled The People's Manifesto: Pakatan the hope of the people, pledging to reduce their financial burden, among other promises. Anwar, who has taught at Oxford and Georgetown University, said he would return to academic life if he lost the next election to incumbent prime minister Najib Razak.

Pakatan Rakyat did not achieve the regime change target in the election despite obtaining 50.9% of the popular vote compared to the 47.4% gained by Barisan Nasional. This was attributed to the heavy malapportionment of the electoral districts. Pakatan Rakyat also gained 7 more parliamentary seats compared to the 12th general election.

Anwar did not concede defeat, alleging widespread electoral fraud. Al Jazeera reported that Anwar Ibrahim came close to winning the election on 5 May 2013 but refused to admit defeat, and therefore also did not step down. In an interview for ABC News, interviewer Jim Middleton suggested that Anwar Ibrahim was going to be the Lee Kuan Yew of the Malaysian opposition. Anwar answered that he was not at that stage yet.

On 7 May 2013, Anwar Ibrahim vowed to lead a "fierce movement" to reform the country's electoral system and challenge the results of an election he lost. On 8 May 2013, about 120,000 people wearing black gathered at Petaling Jaya Stadium, Kelana Jaya, Selangor, to attend a rally organised by Anwar to protest against the election results and demand a free and fair election. The #Black505 movement continued for another 2 months with touring all over the country. A successful fundraising #Black505 dinner was held in Thean Hou Temple hall on 22 June 2013, hosted by Wangsa Maju MP Datuk Dr Tan Kee Kwong on behalf of PKR. Anwar Ibrahim immediately launched electoral petitions for over 30 disputed parliamentary seats in July 2013. However, the cases were thrown off election court for technical reasons. Anwar described the decision as a bad decision and disgraced the name of the country's judicial institution.

Kajang Move

On 27 January 2014, the member of the Selangor State Legislative Assembly for Kajang, Lee Chin Cheh, resigned. This triggered a by-election. A day later, Anwar Ibrahim was announced as Pakatan Rakyat candidate for the by-election. Anwar's candidacy was originally to propel him to become Selangor's Menteri Besar. Later, this move was known as the "Kajang Move".

This move, however, did not materialize as he was sentenced to five years' prison after Malaysia's Court of Appeal overturned his sodomy acquittal, causing Anwar to lose his qualification to be the state assembly candidate. On 9 March 2014, PKR announced party president Dr Wan Azizah Wan Ismail as its new candidate for the Kajang by-election. Anwar's Datuk Seri title was stripped by the Sultan of Selangor for "repeated questioning of the integrity" of the state's ruler during the subsequent crisis that saw the Sultan refuse to appoint Wan Azizah as Menteri Besar. Anwar was able to continue using the "Datuk Seri" title because it had also been conferred on him by several other Malaysian states.

2008-2014 sodomy trials

On 29 June 2008, online news portal Malaysiakini reported that a male aide of Anwar, Saiful Bukhari Azlan, had lodged a police report claiming that he had been sodomised by Anwar. Anwar said that the possibility of a prison sentence as a result of the allegations could be seen as an attempt to remove him from the leadership of the opposition following his growing support and by-election victories. He also reaffirmed his innocence and cited evidence in the form of medical reports. In July 2008, he was arrested over allegations of sodomy again, but was acquitted of the charge in January 2012 by The High Court. The presiding judge ruled that DNA evidence used in the case had been compromised and was unreliable. The prosecution filed an appeal against the acquittal.

On 7 March 2014, the Court of Appeal overturned the acquittal by unanimously deciding that the High Court failed to "critically evaluate" the evidence submitted by government chemist Dr Seah Lay Hong. The Court of Appeal rushed through an unanimous decision, signed by all three judges, and sentenced Anwar to five years imprisonment, disqualifying him from nomination in the Kajang by-election scheduled on 11 March. The conviction was viewed by some as a politically motivated attempt to prevent Anwar from contesting in the 2014 Kajang by-election, which he was expected to win and becoming Selangor's chief minister. Human Rights Watch and the International Commission of Jurists have accused the Malaysian government of meddling in this particular judicial matter and said the verdict was politically motivated. On 10 February 2015, the Federal Court of Malaysia upheld the decision of the Court of Appeal and affirmed the five-year prison sentence. He was sent immediately to Sungai Buloh Prison, Selangor, to serve the sentence.

Pakatan Harapan backbencher (2018–2020)

Royal pardon and release
After the Pakatan Rakyat's dissolution during his imprisonment, a new opposition coalition named the Pakatan Harapan was formed with Anwar as the de facto leader in absentia. The coalition had come into power by overthrowing Barisan Nasional in the 2018 general election (GE14). Following the formation of the new ruling government, Anwar was given a full royal pardon and was released from prison on 16 May 2018. He was designated to take over the reins from interim Prime Minister Mahathir Mohamad as planned and agreed by the coalition before GE14. In an interview, he justified his reluctance to immediately step into power on the basis that Mahathir has appeared committed to the reform agenda, and doing a good job tackling a "disintegrating" political system. He also added that he was keen to travel and honour speaking engagements. Anwar also indicated that he initially had reservations about Mahathir's "reconciliation efforts", but he eventually forgave his former enemy after Mahathir showed "compassion and concern which (Anwar) thought was absent in the past".

Return to parliament through Port Dickson by-election

Anwar returned to Parliament through the Port Dickson by-election on 13 October 2018, after receiving a royal pardon for a sodomy conviction he maintained was politically motivated. He won the by-election with an increased majority, returning to Parliament for the first time in three years. The seat had been vacated by army veteran Danyal Balagopal Abdullah, with rumours circulating that he was paid RM25 million for doing so.

Sheraton Move and return to opposition

In late February 2020, the Pakatan Harapan government of Dr Mahathir Mohamad collapsed following defections by Anwar's deputy, Azmin Ali, and several PKR MPs aligned to him, along with the withdrawal of BERSATU by party President Muhyiddin Yassin from Pakatan Harapan. Mahathir promptly resigned from the premiership, as well as from his party, BERSATU. The political manoeuvring has been labelled the "Sheraton Move" for the hotel in Petaling Jaya at which defecting MPs gathered with the opposition to show support for a new government. Following the resignation of Mahathir, Anwar attempted to gather support for his appointment as Prime Minister. However, BERSATU president, Muhyiddin Yassin, was eventually appointed Prime Minister, with the support of a slender majority in the Dewan Rakyat. Thus, Pakatan Harapan returned to the opposition benches, while Anwar was named Opposition Leader.

Second term as Leader of the Opposition (2020–2022)
While Muhyiddin formed a government under the auspices of a new coalition known as Perikatan Nasional, Mahathir attempted to regain his post with his Pakatan allies. However, under Anwar's leadership, KEADILAN refused to endorse Mahathir's bid for a third term as premier, claiming the nonagenarian had reneged on his repeated pledge to hand over the office to Anwar. Mahathir, in turn, refused to lend support to Anwar's candidacy, and nominated Sabah Chief Minister, Shafie Apdal, for the Prime Minister's post instead. Despite the support of allies DAP and Amanah for this compromise, KEADILAN again rejected the proposal and continued to propose Anwar as the coalition candidate.

Support from UMNO MPs 
In September 2020, Anwar claimed to have gathered support from a "formidable" majority of MPs for his appointment as Prime Minister. The move however failed. In July 2022, Anwar said he had the chance to lead the country when a majority of MPs signed statutory declarations backing him as prime minister. However, he claimed he was forced to back down from his quest to become prime minister as he was asked to give assurances to key figures in Barisan Nasional and UMNO that he would discontinue their court cases.

Leaked phone call with Zahid Hamidi 
In April 2021, the four-minute clip, allegedly of a phone conversation between Anwar and UMNO's president, Zahid Hamidi, was first posted on Facebook and started with Zahid's speech during the recent UMNO general assembly, in which he said the party in which he is the president would not accept Anwar, DAP or BERSATU as allies. It was followed by a phone conversation, with the speaker who sounded like Anwar praising the other for the speech. Zahid has since expressed his shock and disappointment at the recording, calling it fake and an attempt to weaken and destroy UMNO, while Anwar has also rejected the audio recording, similarly calling it fake and slanderous and the latest ploy by "some elements in the government leadership" to damage inter-party ties within the Opposition Pakatan Harapan coalition ahead of GE15.

Although Anwar did not publicly admit his involvement, he said the leaked audio recording of a conversation between himself and Zahid does not reveal any wrongdoing and is simply a political tactic to try and damage his reputation. He says that if the recording is genuine, then there is no problem as there is no evidence of treachery or corruption.

In July 2021, Zahid Hamidi has admitted that it was his voice in a recording of a phone conversation with Anwar, which exposed his cooperation with the PKR leader. Zahid also admitted that he had signed a letter supporting Anwar as prime minister.

Nominations as the prime minister candidate 
In the 20 October 2022 PH convention, PH officially announced Anwar Ibrahim as the coalition's candidate for prime minister in the 2022 general election. Anwar announced he will contest the Tambun parliamentary seat in the 2022 general election. He declared Perak as PH's GE15 frontline state. If he becomes PM, the first order of business will be to form a smaller cabinet and reduce cabinet ministers' salaries. Anwar has picked Tambun as one of the seats to contest in the upcoming general election as a message that treachery in politics is not acceptable. The incumbent Tambun MP is former Perak's Menteri Besar Ahmad Faizal Azumu, who is accused of traitorously switching sides to Perikatan Nasional shortly after the Sheraton Move.

Prime Minister (since 2022)

Forming the federal government 

In the 2022 Malaysian general election on 19 November 2022, Anwar's Pakatan Harapan coalition won a plurality of 82 seats out of 222, below the 112 seats needed for a majority. On 20 November, Anwar said that Pakatan Harapan had negotiated with other parties to form the federal government with a majority pending approval by the Yang di-Pertuan Agong, but Anwar refused to mention which other parties were cooperating with Pakatan Harapan. Also that day, Perikatan Nasional leader Muhyiddin Yassin claimed to have a sufficient majority to be appointed as Prime Minister, citing support from Perikatan Nasional, Barisan Nasional, Gabungan Parti Sarawak, and Gabungan Rakyat Sabah. On 21 November, Anwar was one of several Pakatan Harapan leaders that met in Seri Pacific Hotel with several Barisan Nasional leaders, including Ahmad Zahid Hamidi and Ismail Sabri Yaakob.

On 22 November, the royal palace stated that after the Yang di-Pertuan Agong reviewed the statutory declarations for prime minister, he found that "no member of parliament has the majority support to be appointed prime minister", so the Yang di-Pertuan Agong summoned Anwar and Muhyiddin to meet him. After the meeting, Muhyiddin said that the Yang di-Pertuan Agong proposed a unity government between Pakatan Harapan and Perikatan Nasional, but Muhyiddin rejected it as Perikatan Nasional "will not cooperate" with Pakatan Harapan; while Anwar acknowledged that the prime minister had yet to be determined, while stating that "given time, I think we will secure a simple majority".

Anwar was sworn-in as Malaysia's 10th Prime Minister on 24 November 2022, by the Yang di-Pertuan Agong, Al-Sultan Abdullah, after consulting with the Conference of Rulers of Malaysia. However, Muhyiddin continued to insist that he had the support of a majority of 115 MPs to form the next government and called on Anwar to prove his majority by showing his Statutory Declarations. As of 24 November, Anwar had received support from MPs from PH, BN, GPS, Warisan, MUDA and PBM, as well as independent MPs. Anwar pledged to hold a vote of confidence on 19 December 2022, once MPs had been sworn into the Dewan Rakyat.

On 25 November, both Anwar and GRS leader Hajiji Noor stated that GRS had joined the unity government, supporting Anwar; this resulted in Anwar having two-thirds support in Parliament, stated Anwar. Meanwhile, Muhyiddin congratulated Anwar and acknowledged him as Prime Minister, thanked Anwar for inviting PN to join the unity government, and declined Anwar's invitation, stating that PN would play the role of a "credible opposition" to ensure "corruption-free governance".

Cabinet appointments 
Anwar announced his cabinet on December 2. He took on the role of Minister of Finance concurrently with prime minister, while head of Barisan Nasional Ahmad Zahid Hamidi and Fadillah Yusof were appointed deputy prime ministers. Zahid's appointment was in spite of his ongoing trials for money laundering, bribery and criminal breach of trust.

Domestic affairs 
On the first parliamentary session of his premiership, Anwar called a vote of confidence in his leadership on 19 December and won it with a simple majority. Anwar also announced cuts in energy subsidies for large businesses.

In January 2023, Anwar travelled to Kota Kinabalu to address a political crisis in Sabah.

Foreign affairs

Political positions and views
Anwar has advocated for Islamic democracy and has expressed hope that Malaysia be an example of democratic practices in the Muslim world. He has been described as a "liberal reformer, talented technocrat, genuine intellectual and perhaps even a man capable of bringing the spirit of the Arab Spring to one of Asia's largest majority Muslim nations." He has supported the Islamic concept of Ummah as a framework for democracy in Muslim countries, and called the three-world model "redundant" and "simplistic". Anwar has called for judicial independence, good governance and rejection of authoritarianism. During his time as a youth activist in his early career, he expressed his admiration for Philippine revolutionary José Rizal.

During his early political career in the 1960s, Anwar said that he supported affirmative action policies for Malays due to his concern about the dominance of Malaysian Chinese in businesses, but later changed his views. After leaving prison, he said that he considered "Malay supremacy" a "major problem". Referencing longstanding affirmative action policies for Malays and other bumiputera, in 2019 he called for transitioning to "affirmative-action policies [being] premised on need instead of race" and that those living in poverty can receive government support regardless of their race.

In 2018, The Guardian described him as a "uniting figure" for the opposition throughout his imprisonment and trials.

Israel and Palestine
In a press conference at the London School of Economics in March 2010, Anwar stated that Jews should not be condemned, but rather only the state ideology of Zionism and the aggression and injustice perpetrated against the Palestinians. He also believes that there are good and bad Jews, just as there are good and bad Muslims. In May 2010, B'nai B'rith International, a prominent Jewish human rights organisation, argued that Anwar has used his position in Malaysian parliament to spread anti-Semitic propaganda, such as his claim that Israeli spies are "directly involved in the running of the government". B'nai B'rith asked US officials to suspend their ties with Anwar Ibrahim.

In a 2012 interview with The Wall Street Journal, Anwar Ibrahim stated that he believes the policy towards Israel and Palestine should be clear – protecting the security of Israel while also being firm in protecting the legitimate interests of the Palestinians. Anwar later clarified his stance, saying that the remarks were consistent with the two-state solution adopted by the United Nations and Malaysia itself.

Anwar has also condemned US bias over the Israel-Palestine conflict, and called for Malaysia to recognise Jerusalem as the capital of Palestine.

LGBT issues

Anwar has stated that he opposes gay marriage and upholds the sanctity of marriage between men and women. In a 2015 interview with BBC, Anwar reaffirmed his belief that marriage should remain between men and women. However, he stated that laws on sodomy in Malaysia must be changed as they are archaic. He clarified that he does not advocate legalising homosexuality or making gay marriage permissible — only that the laws should be amended to ensure private affairs are not penalised. In 2018, he has urged religious people of all faiths to counter the demand by "super liberals" for LGBT rights. In December 2022, he has filed a defamation suit to Perak PAS chief Razman Zakaria over his claim in a speech that Anwar is an LGBT supporter. In an interview with Radio Television Malaysia (RTM) on 6 January 2023, Anwar said that the rights of the LGBT community, the concept of a secular state and communist ideologies will not be recognised under his administration.

Personal life
Anwar is an ethnic Malay and a Muslim. He married Wan Azizah Wan Ismail on 26 February 1980. They have five daughters and a son. His eldest daughter, Nurul Izzah Anwar, was an MP for Permatang Pauh.

During his trials and time in prison in the 2000s, Anwar spent time in solitary confinement, and experienced frequent beatings which required him to undertake surgery in Germany upon his release. He once appeared in court with a black eye. Anwar has professed an interest in the works of William Shakespeare, and said that he read a copy of his complete works four and a half times during his imprisonment. He presented a paper to the World Shakespeare Congress in 2006. In prison, he also said he survived by singing songs and reading.

Awards and recognitions

Honours of Malaysia
  :
  Grand Knight of the Order of Sultan Ahmad Shah of Pahang (SSAP) – Dato' Sri (1990)
  :
  Grand Commander of the Exalted Order of Malacca (DGSM) – Datuk Seri (1991)
  :
  Companion of the Order of the Defender of State (DMPN) – Dato' (1991)
  Knight Grand Commander of the Order of the Defender of State (DUPN) – Dato' Seri Utama (1994)
 :
  (1992, revoked 3 November 2014)
  :
  Knight Grand Commander of the Order of Loyalty to Negeri Sembilan (SPNS) – Dato' Seri Utama (1994)
  :
  Grand Commander of the Order of Kinabalu (SPDK) – Datuk Seri Panglima (1994) 
  :
  Grand Knight of the Order of Cura Si Manja Kini (SPCM) – Dato' Seri (1995)
  :
   Knight Grand Companion of the Order of the Gallant Prince Syed Sirajuddin Jamalullail (SSPJ) – Dato' Seri Diraja (1995)

Foreign honours
:
 Knight Grand Cross of the Order of the Knights of Rizal (KGCR) (1997)

Honorary degrees
  :
 Honorary Ph.D. degree in Political Education from Universitas Negeri Padang (2018)
  :
 Honorary Ph.D. degree in Law from University of the Philippines Diliman (2023)

Election results

See also
Caucus on Reform and Governance
Port Dickson (federal constituency)
Permatang Pauh (federal constituency)
Tambun (federal constituency)

References

Other references

Bibliography
 Alias Muhammad, PAS' Platform: Development and Change, 1951–1986, Gateway Publishing House, 1994, 
 Charles Allers, The Evolution of a Muslim Democrat: The Life of Malaysia's Anwar Ibrahim, Peter Lang, 2013, 
 Moktar Petah, Kerajaan mansuh kekebalan Raja Melayu, ART Media, 1993,

External links

 Official homepage
 Profile: Anwar Ibrahim
Victor Pogadaev. Anwar Ibrahim – A Phoenix Rising From Ashes 

|-

|-

|-

|-

|-

|-

|-

|-

|-

|-

|-

|-

|-

|-

|-

|-

|-

 
1947 births
Living people
People from Penang
Prime Ministers of Malaysia
Deputy Prime Ministers of Malaysia
Malaysian Muslims
Malaysian people of Malay descent
Malaysian democracy activists
Islamic democracy activists
Leaders of political parties in Malaysia
People's Justice Party (Malaysia) politicians
Independent politicians in Malaysia
Former United Malays National Organisation politicians
Members of the Dewan Rakyat
Members of the 15th Malaysian Parliament
Malaysian Leaders of the Opposition
Spouses of Deputy Prime Ministers of Malaysia
Agriculture ministers of Malaysia
Culture ministers of Malaysia
Education ministers of Malaysia
Finance ministers of Malaysia
Sports ministers of Malaysia
Youth ministers of Malaysia
Walsh School of Foreign Service faculty
University of Malaya alumni
National University of Malaysia alumni
Grand Commanders of the Order of Kinabalu
Amnesty International prisoners of conscience held by Malaysia
Malaysian prisoners and detainees
Prisoners and detainees of Malaysia
Malaysian politicians convicted of crimes
People prosecuted under anti-homosexuality laws
People convicted of sodomy
Recipients of Malaysian royal pardons
20th-century criminals
20th-century Malaysian politicians
21st-century Malaysian politicians